Marjan Gerasimovski (Macedonian Cyrillic: Марјан Герасимовски; born 12 March 1974) is a retired Macedonian international football player. He was recently managed the Macedonian club FK Metalurg Skopje.

Club career 
After playing for the country champions FK Vardar he signed with the Serbian club FK Partizan where he played three seasons and also played in the national team. Before returning to Macedonia, he played one season for the Polish club Legia Warsaw.

At the beginning of the 2013–14 season he was coaching one of FK Vardar youth teams.

International career
He made his senior debut for Macedonia in a February 1999 friendly match away against Albania and has earned a total of 9 caps, scoring no goals. His final international was an October 2000 FIFA World Cup qualification match against Moldova. He did win a tenth cap, although in an unofficial match against Hungary in November 2000.

Honours 
Vardar Skopje
1 time Macedonian Cup winner: 1998
Partizan Belgrade
1 time First League of FR Yugoslavia Champion: 1998–99
2 times Yugoslav Cup winner: 1998 and 2001
Legia Warsaw
1 time Ekstraklasa Champion: 2001–02
1 time Polish League Cup winner: 2002
Cementarnica Skopje
1 time Macedonian Cup winner: 2003

References

External links
 

1974 births
Living people
Sportspeople from Tetovo
Association football defenders
Macedonian footballers
North Macedonia international footballers
FK Cementarnica 55 players
FK Vardar players
FK Partizan players
Legia Warsaw players
Macedonian expatriate footballers
Expatriate footballers in Serbia and Montenegro
Macedonian expatriate sportspeople in Serbia and Montenegro
Expatriate footballers in Poland
Macedonian expatriate sportspeople in Poland
Macedonian football managers
FK Metalurg Skopje managers